Ronnie Shakes (born Ronald Michael Sakele; February 21, 1947 – May 16, 1987) was a stand up comedian who made seven appearances on the Tonight Show Starring Johnny Carson from 1984 to 1987. Shakes died at age 40 of a heart attack while jogging.

References

External links
 
 

1947 births
1987 deaths
20th-century American comedians